Nothing New for Trash Like You is an album from American ska-punk band Against All Authority. The album was first released in 2001 on Sub City Records. Songs 12-17 were previously included on Destroy What Destroys You, and other tracks were lifted off of various split albums.

Track listing
"Just an Obstruction" – 1:32
"That Way" – 2:19
"In on Your Joke" – 1:41
Seattle hardcore band Christ On A Crutch cover.
"Bakunin" – 2:18
About nineteenth-century Russian anarchist Mikhail Bakunin.
"Livin' In Miami" – 1:52
"When It Comes Down to You" – 1:38
"Nothing to Lose" – 2:08
"Haymarket Square" – 2:13
Deals with the 1886 U.S. Haymarket Riot.
"Sacco & Vanzetti" – 1:36
Deals with the Sacco and Vanzetti case, in which two Italian anarchists were executed for murder in 1927.
"Alba" – 1:55
About the Cuban mother of a bandmember.
"Threat" – 1:49
The Pist cover
"Hard as Fuck" – 2:06
"Centerfold" – 1:52
J. Geils Band cover.
"Above the Law" – 2:49
"We Won't Submit" – 2:12
"Court 22" – 2:10
"Under Your Authority" – 2:39
"Ska Sucks" – 1:34
Propagandhi cover.

Personnel 
 Danny Lore - Vocals/Bass
 Joe Koontz - Guitar/Vocals
 Fin Leavell - Bass Trombone
 Spikey Goldbach - Drums

References

2001 albums
Against All Authority albums